Following is a list of notable Louisiana Creole restaurants:

 Acadia: A New Orleans Bistro, Portland, Oregon, U.S.
 Antoine's, New Orleans, Louisiana, U.S.
 Arnaud's, New Orleans
 Brennan's, New Orleans
 Broussard's, New Orleans
 Café du Monde, New Orleans
 Eat: An Oyster Bar, Portland, Oregon
 Galatoire's, New Orleans
 Mosca's
 The Parish, Portland, Oregon
 Upperline Restaurant

References

Louisiana Creole